In Greek mythology, Ocridion (Ancient Greek: Ὀκριδίωνος) was a mortal who was engaged to Cydippe, daughter of Ochimus.  She was kidnapped by her uncle, Cercaphus.

Note

References
Lucius Mestrius Plutarchus, Moralia with an English Translation by Frank Cole Babbitt. Cambridge, MA. Harvard University Press. London. William Heinemann Ltd. 1936. Online version at the Perseus Digital Library. Greek text available from the same website.

Rhodian characters in Greek mythology